Pedro Jose Jirón Rugama "Peche Jirón" (18 December 1939 – 7 September 2018) was a Nicaraguan professional footballer who played as a midfielder.

Club career 
Pedro played in the First Division only with Diriangén for 15 years and was their captain for eight years. Pedro was a universal footbller, with the natural ability to play football anywhere in the world. Winning 3 league titles with Diriangén and aiding the great Manuel Cuadra to many goals.

International career 
Pedro captained the Nicaragua national football team for 6 six years and played 5 matches for them as they came sixth in the 1967 CONCACAF Championship.

Style of play
He was an exceptional footballer because he dominated all aspects of the game, his extraordinary vitality allowed him to step on all the grass without leaving a single inch of it without his mark. He is considered the best midfield player of all time for his discipline, for his self-sacrificing dedication as a worker on the field of play, for his feline strategy, his astute tactics and because he was also a mixture of strength and talent.

Life after career
On 9 February 1995, Pedro was inducted into the Nicaraguan Sports Hall of Fame.

Honours
Primera División de Nicaragua: 1959, 1969, 1970

References 

1939 births
2018 deaths
Nicaraguan men's footballers
Association football midfielders